Rossinavi, founded in 1980, is an Italian shipyard based in Viareggio and specialized in the construction of full-custom steel and aluminium superyachts.

History 

The Rossi shipyard was born in 1980, when the first unlimited partnership company, bound to the mere metallic fabrication, is established by the young brothers Claudio and Paride Rossi.

The eighties see the building of the first inland and coastal passenger vessels together with the production of steel and aluminium hulls and superstructures on account of major shipyards. In the early nineties, the company starts to grow up thanks to a facilities expansions politic.

Determined to leave the subcontractor role, during 2007 the company performed a complete restyling of its image, by acquiring the new brand 'Rossinavi'.

The new brand debuts one year later with the delivery of the 55 metre motor yacht South (now Rarity), followed by the launch of the 70 metre Numptia (now High Power III) in 2011. Since then, the shipyard has launched other 15 full-custom superyachts, with additional 5 motor yachts currently under construction.

Fleet

Awards

See also

 Azimut Yachts
 Baglietto
 Benetti
 Codecasa
 Fincantieri
 Sanlorenzo
 List of Italian companies

References

External links 
Rossinavi − Website

Shipbuilding companies of Italy
Shipyards of Italy
Yacht building companies
Italian boat builders
Italian companies established in 1980
Italian brands
Companies based in Tuscany
Viareggio